UD Almería is a Spanish professional football club based in Almería, Andalusia. The first manager of the club was Pepe Navarro.

The most successful manager of Almería was Unai Emery, who achieved the club's first promotion to La Liga ever and took them to a final eighth position in 2007–08 (the club's best overall).

List of managers

See also
UD Almería statistics
UD Almería seasons

References

External links
Ideal article 
BDFutbol managers history

 
Almeria
Managers